USS Captain Dud (ID-3507), later USS YD-43, was a United States Navy floating derrick in service from 1918 to 1956.

Captain Dud was built in 1914 as the commercial wooden, pontoon-hull, steel A-frame floating derrick Captain Dud S507 by S. Flory at Bangor, Pennsylvania; her design included a copper-sheathed house. In 1918 the U.S. Navy acquired her from her owner, the Thames Towboat Company of New London, Connecticut, for use during World War I, assigned her the naval registry identification number 3507, and placed her in service as USS Captain Dud (ID-3507).

Captain Dud was assigned to the 5th Naval District. When the U.S. Navy adopted its modern hull number system on 17 July 1920, she was classified as a floating crane (YD), her name was dropped, and she became USS YD-43.

YD-43 was rebuilt in 1932 and remained in service until 1956.

References

 

 

Auxiliary ships of the United States Navy
World War I auxiliary ships of the United States
World War II auxiliary ships of the United States
1914 ships
Crane vessels
Floating cranes
Individual cranes (machines)